Calcium diglutamate, sometimes abbreviated CDG and also called calcium glutamate, is a compound with formula Ca(C5H8NO4)2. It is a calcium acid salt of glutamic acid. CDG is a flavor enhancer (E number E623)—it is the calcium analog of monosodium glutamate (MSG). Because the glutamate is the actual flavor-enhancer, CDG has the same flavor-enhancing properties as MSG but without the increased sodium content. As a soluble source of calcium ions, this chemical is also used as a first-aid treatment for exposure to hydrofluoric acid.

References 

Glutamates
Calcium compounds
E-number additives